Li Dan (born 1 May 1995) is a Chinese long-distance runner. In 2019, she competed in the women's marathon at the 2019 World Athletics Championships held in Doha, Qatar. She did not finish her race.

Career 

In 2018, she competed in the women's 5000 metres event at the 2018 Asian Games held in Indonesia. In 2019, she finished in 5th place in the women's 5000 metres event at the 2019 Asian Athletics Championships held in Doha, Qatar. In that same year, she won the bronze medal in the women's marathon at the 2019 Military World Games held in Wuhan, China. She also won the bronze medal in the women's marathon team event, alongside Ma Yugui and Zheng Zhiling.

Competition record

References

External links 
 

Living people
1995 births
Place of birth missing (living people)
Chinese female long-distance runners
Chinese female marathon runners
Chinese female cross country runners
Asian Games competitors for China
Athletes (track and field) at the 2018 Asian Games
World Athletics Championships athletes for China
Asian Cross Country Championships winners
21st-century Chinese women